Battles of the Hundred Days is a board game published by Operational Studies Group in 1979.

Gameplay
Battles of the Hundred Days is a Napoleonic wargame.

Reviews
Phoenix
Moves(p14)

References

External links
 

Operational Studies Group games
Wargames introduced in 1979